Antero Alli is a professional astrologer who has authored books on experimental theatre, astrology and Timothy Leary's 8-circuit model of consciousness. He lives in Portland, Oregon, where he conducts workshops and stages theatrical productions, some of which have been released as films.

Film and theatrical work

Alli was born on 11 November 1952, in Finland. He calls his work in experimental theatre paratheatre, a term borrowed from the writings of Jerzy Grotowski. He conducted private paratheatrical workshops in the Bay Area (1977–83 and 1996–2015), some of which evolved into public productions and provided the material for his films. In late 2015, he relocated to Portland to continue his work.

Between 1976 and 1999, Alli wrote and directed a series of plays exploring mystical themes: Circles (1976), Coronation at Stillnight (1977), The Conjunction (1978), Chapel Perilous (1983), Animamundi (1989), and Hungry Ghosts of Albion (1999). Between 1992 and 2002 Alli co-curated the Nomad Film Festival, a Pacific coast touring venue featuring short experimental films and videos. After 1993, he focused on underground feature-length art films with mystical themes, such as The Oracle (1993), The Drivetime (1995), Tragos (2001), Hysteria (2002), Under a Shipwrecked Moon (2003), and The Greater Circulation (2005), a cinematic treatment of Rainer Maria Rilke's Requiem For a Friend. In 2015, he stopped making feature films to return full-time to creating intermedia ritual-based theatre works such as Turbulence of Muses (2016), Bardoville (2017), Soror Mystica (2017), Fallen Monsters (2018), and Escape from Chapel Perilous (2018). Over the next four years, he returned to cinema with three features, The Vanishing Field (2020), The Alchemy of Sulphur, and Tracer (2022).

Writing

Alli's books span a number of subjects, but all share common themes with his paratheatrical efforts: archetypes, personal mythology and the use of ritual to transform consciousness. Like his colleague Rob Brezsny, Alli proposes a free will approach to astrology, which provides clients with information to make decisions rather than deterministic predictions; in his introduction to Astrologik, Brezsny calls Alli's approach "a rowdy and iridescent system of astrology that liberates and never ensnares." In Towards an Archaeology of the Soul (2003), Alli presents a detailed account of the theories and processes that go into his own paratheatrical creations.

In 1991–1995, Alli was editor/publisher of Talking Raven Quarterly, a Seattle-based literary journal featuring the writings of Robert Anton Wilson, Hakim Bey, and Brezsny, among others.

In 2006, Alli taught a course on his book AngelTech at Robert Anton Wilson's Maybe Logic Academy.

Books
Alli, Antero (1987). AngelTech. New Falcon. 
Alli, Antero (1988). All Rites Reversed: Ritual Technology for Self-Initiation. New Falcon. 
Alli, Antero (1988). The Akashic Record Player: A Non-Stop Geomantic Conspiracy. New Falcon. 
Alli, Antero (1990). Astrologik. Vigilantero Press. 
Alli, Antero (1993). Letters, Essays and Premonitions. Vigilantero Press/Vertical Pool.
Alli, Antero and Sylvie Pickering (1996). The Vertical Oracle. Vertical Pool. 
Alli, Antero (2003). Towards an Archeology of the Soul. Vertical Pool. 
Hyatt, Christopher S. and Antero Alli (1988 then 2006). A Modern Shaman's Guide to a Pregnant Universe. New Falcon. 
Alli, Antero (2009). The Eight-Circuit Brain: Navigational Strategies for the Energetic Body. Vertical Pool. 
Alli, Antero (2020). "State of Emergence: Experiments in Group Ritual Dynamics". The Original Falcon Press. 
Alli, Antero (2022). "Experiential Astrology: From the Map to the Territory". The Original Falcon Press. 
Alli, Antero (2023). "Last Words: Towards an Insurrection of the Poetic Imagination". The Original Falcon Press. 
Alli, Antero (2023). "Sacred Rites: Journal Entries of a Gnostic Heretic". The Original Falcon Press.

Filmography
Requiem for a Friend (1991; 40 min)
Archaic Community (1992; 80 min) a paratheatre video document
The Drivetime (1995; 88 min)
The Oracle (1993; 70 min)
Lily in Limbo (1996; 27 min)
Tragos: A Cyber-Noir Witch Hunt (2000; 105 min)
Roadkill (2001; 27 min)
Hysteria (2002; 83 min)
Under a Shipwrecked Moon (2003; 96 min)
Orphans of Delirium (2004; 82 min) a paratheatre video document
The Greater Circulation (2005; 93 min)
The Mind is a Liar and a Whore (2007; 92 min)
The Invisible Forest (2008; 111 min.)To Dream of Falling Upwards (2011-2021; 120 min)Flamingos (2012; 90 min)dreambody/earthbody (2012; 80 min) a paratheatre video documentThe Book of Jane (2013; 117 min)Out of the Woods (2015-2021; 87 min)The Vanishing Field (2020; 72 min)The Alchemy of Sulphur (2021; 109 min)Tracer (2022; 93 min)The Celebrants'' (2023; 32 min)

See also
Eight-circuit model of consciousness
Experimental theatre
Western astrology

References

Antero Alli Recordings with The Radical Change Group at 
Alli Interviewed at Film Threat
Talking Raven from Alli's Website
Alli Interviewed at Key 64

External links
Antero Alli's ParaTheatrical ReSearch Website
Antero Alli's Films, Music & Book catalog Website

An excerpt from Alli's The Akashic Record Player at Deoxy.org
Talking Raven reviewed at Tap Root Reviews

1952 births
Living people
Finnish film directors
Finnish writers
Finnish emigrants to the United States
Writers from Berkeley, California
American astrologers
Lee Strasberg Theatre and Film Institute alumni
20th-century astrologers
21st-century astrologers